The 2015–16 SC Fortuna Köln season is the 69th season (and 67th and 68th overall year) in the football club's history and 2nd consecutive season in the third tier of German football, the 3. Liga, having been promoted from the Regionalliga West in 2014. It is the 6th season overall in the third tier of German football. In addition to the 3. Liga, will also participate in this season's edition of the Middle Rhine Cup, part of the Verbandspokal. This will be the 37th season for the club in the Südstadion, located in Cologne, Germany. The stadium has a capacity of 14,944. For this season, the stadium will also be shared with the women's team of 1. FC Köln.

Background
In the club's first season in the 3. Liga, they finished in 14th place. In the Middle Rhine Cup, they lost in the semifinals to eventual champions and fellow Cologne club FC Viktoria Köln.

Squad

On loan

Transfers

In

Out

Technical staff

Friendlies

Competitions

3. Liga

League table

Results summary

Results by round

Matches

Middle Rhine Cup

References

Fortuna Koln, SC
SC Fortuna Köln seasons